Elena  is a 2012 Brazilian documentary film directed by Petra Costa. It is based on the life of the actress Elena Andrade, Petra Costa's older sister.

Synopsis
Elena moves to New York with the same dream her mother had: to become a movie actress. She leaves behind a childhood spent in hiding during Brazil’s military dictatorship and her teenage years amid theater plays and homemade videos. She also leaves behind Petra, her 7-year-old sister. Finding little success she returns to Brazil but is accepted into university back in New York. This time her mother and Petra go to live in New York with her. Ultimately it's a film about loss, grief and memory

Synopsis
She said goodbye with a modest present: a shell. “If you ever miss me, put you ear to the shell so we can talk”, Elena tells her little sister, 13 years her junior. Petra, at just 7, would listen over and over again to that shell in the weeks to come. Months, then years, then two decades passed. Petra was already an actress and filmmaker when she returned to New York in search of Elena, where she decided to film her own loneliness and longing for her sister.

Elena is a film about the persistence of memories, the irreversibility of loss, the effects of her sister’s absence on a 7-year-old girl, emotions which Petra refers to as “inconsolable memories”. “Gradually, the pain and grievance turn to water, they dissolved into memory”, says the director, both actress and biographical character in her film.

Elena is also a film about the adventure of growing up. It is also the story of three women, which dialogues with themes such as family and maternity, pain and separation. It is also a film about Brazil in the era of the post military dictatorship, about the generation that was born in clandestine circles and grew up between 1970 and 1980, with the very real challenges of having to struggle for their dreams in times of freedom and hope.

Production
The idea of making a film about her sister came about when the director, Petra Costa, was 17 and she came across one of Elena’s old diaries at home, written when she was the same age; just 13. “I had the strange feeling that I was reading my own words, as if it was my diary”, describes Petra. She had a powerful sense of identification with her sister. At that same time, reading Hamlet and the discovery of Ophelia was also a source of inspiration, as well as seeing the film Brainstorm by Laís Bodansky, which amongst other themes, is about the rite of passage from adolescence to adult life, whilst being from the adolescent boys’ point of view. The project for the film remained on standby for ten years, gradually taking form in the director’s imagination. During this time, Petra was involved in a series of other projects and she directed the award winning short film Droopy Eyes, until she finally felt prepared to delve into her memories of her sister.

Petra discovered around 50 hours of home video footage filmed by her sister, of which at least 20 hours had been filmed the year that Petra was born. At 13, Elena received her first video camera. Straight away, Petra began to interview around 50 relatives and friends of Elena, gathering together a total of 200 hours of footage. When she went to New York, she took with her a telephone book with her sister’s old contacts and she set about tracking down the names, one by one, looking them up on the internet and on social networks. The feature film finally began to take form and adopt its definitive structure, when the director decided to introduce herself into the scenes, as both a character and documentary-maker. She filmed her journey and drafted her script alongside her colleague Carolina Ziskind.

As well as New York and São Paulo, several scenes from Elena were filmed in Bahia as well as Barra do Una, in the region of São Sebastião, on the coastal region of the São Paulo province. The film took two and a half years to produce, and had its premiere at the 45th Festival de Brasília, in September 2012, where Elena won prizes for best director, best art direction, best editing and best film according to the public jury, all within the documentary category.

Cast
 Elena Andrade 
 Li An
 Petra Costa

Awards

Credits
Film credits are as follows:
 Directing: Petra Costa
 Screenplay: Petra Costa, Carolina Ziskind
 Production Company: Busca Vida Filmes
 Executive Producers: Julia Bock, Daniela Santos
 Associated Producers: Felipe Duarte, Sara Dosa
 Producer in New York: Caroline Onikute
 Production coordinator: Vanesssa Elias
 Producer (release): Bernardo Bath
 Executive Producer Assistant: Isadora Ferreira
 Photography: Janice D´avila, Will Etchebehere, Miguel Vassy
 Art Directors: Martha Kiss Perrone, Alonso Pafyese, Lorena Ortiz
 Film Editing: Marilia Moraes, Tina Baz
 First Editing: Idê Lacreta
 Additional Editing and Direction Assistant: Virginia Primo
 Sound Design: Olivier Goinard, Guile Martins
 Sound Mixer: Olivier Goinard
 Direct Sound: Edson Secco
 Soundtrack supervision: Fil Pinheiro
 Original soundtrack: Vitor Araújo, Fil Pinheiro, Maggie Clifford, Gustavo Ruiz
 Post-production coordinator: Laura Futuro
 Post-production assistant: Fabio de Borthole
 Editing room assistant: Andre Gustavo Requião
 Screenplay consultant: Daniela Capelato
 Screenplay doctoring: Aleksei Abib
 Casting preparation: Martha Kiss Perrone
 Editing consultant: Xavier Box

References

External links
  
 

2012 films
Brazilian documentary films
2012 documentary films
Films shot in New York City
Documentary films about actors
Variance Films films
Films scored by Edson Secco
2010s Portuguese-language films